The 2018 Dalian Transcendence F.C. season is the 5th and the last season in its existence. The club dissolved after this season.

Overview
After sided with the team last season as the caretaker, Li Guoxu will become the head coach. The team expected their position to be 8th-10th.

After 5 defeats in a row at the start of the season, Dalian Transcendence decided to replace Li Guoxu with Dželaludin Muharemović, who worked with Rusmir Cviko as assistant coach in the previous season.

The team sold naming right to local automobile dealer Dalian Huifeng on 16 July, to compete as Dalian Huifeng Automobile Plaza F.C. hence.

Transcendence merely prevented relegation in the previous two seasons. However, the team found themselves at a confirmed 15th position after the 28 October defeat, and would regretfully descend into 2019 China League Two.

On 13 January 2019, Transcendence failed to sign up the salary confirmation file of the 2018 season, and thus lost the license into the 2019 China League One. The owner decided one day later to disband the team regretfully.

Kits 
Dalian Transcendence 2018 kits were featured with patterns of ocean tides and waves, sponsored by Joma.

Preseason

Training matches

China League One

League table

Results summary

Position by round

League fixtures and results

Chinese FA Cup

FA Cup fixtures and results

Player information

Transfers

In

Out

Squad

Reserve squad

Squad statistics

Appearances and goals 
As of July 2018.

Goalscorers

Disciplinary record

References 

Dalian Transcendence F.C.
Dalian Transcendence F.C. seasons